William Wallace Russ (6 July 1899 – 13 August 1977) was an Australian rules footballer who played with North Melbourne and Footscray in the Victorian Football League (VFL).

A centreman, Russ was a member of North Melbourne's inaugural VFL side in 1925. In 1929 he crossed to Footscray and was their season's best and fairest winner.

See also
 1927 Melbourne Carnival

References

External links

 

1899 births
1977 deaths
North Melbourne Football Club players
Western Bulldogs players
Charles Sutton Medal winners
Footscray Football Club (VFA) players
Australian rules footballers from Victoria (Australia)